Jalan Puchong–Dengkil or Jalan Puchong–Cyberjaya (Selangor state route B15) is a major road in Puchong and Cyberjaya, Selangor, Malaysia.

External links
 www.BandarPuchong.com Bandar Puchong Community Online 

Roads in Selangor